Saint Joan of Arc Roman Catholic School is a Roman Catholic secondary school and sixth form with academy status, located in Rickmansworth, Hertfordshire, England. The catchment area for the school spreads over South West Hertfordshire, parts of Buckinghamshire and parts of North West London.

History

20th Century
St Joan of Arc School for Girls was instigated by an order of French nuns, the Filles de Jesus, in 1904 with just five pupils.

The school continued to grow in size and reputation through the early years of the 20th Century until 1951 when it was granted grammar school status. In 1978, as with the majority of grammar schools across the country, St Joan of Arc moved to become a comprehensive school and switched to a co-educational facility. During 1978, the school also set the Guinness World Record for balloon bursting; the school managed to burst 2,000 balloons in 14 minutes 14.5 seconds.

21st Century
In 2002, pupils at the school worked together to relaunch the school website, becoming the first pupil-run website in the area and having been considered for the 2002 BECTA (British Educational Community and Technology Agency) awards. The school was awarded Specialist Status for Mathematics & Computing in 2003 and in 2012, St Joan of Arc converted to become an academy as the founding school of the 'All Saints Catholic Academy Trust' (ASCAT). Since changing to Academy status, the schools OFSTED rating was lowered from 'Outstanding' to 'Good'; headteacher Mr Sweeney cited changes in the methods used by OFSTED as one of the reasons for the difference.

During the 2019 Coronavirus outbreak, as per national guidelines, St Joan of Arc closed completely and with other schools in the district donated vital protective equipment to local hospitals to help the fight against the virus.

School site 

The Parish priest at St Mary's in Rickmansworth, Fr Julien, bought the initial property, 11 High Street, known as ‘Englefield’ and this was to become the original site for St Joan of Arc School. Englefield was the large Edwardian house that currently houses the St Joan of Arc Sixth Form. This was to be the site for St Joan of Arc School until 1922. As the school went from strength to strength so the need for a larger premises became apparent. This need for greater space lead to the Mother Superior (Mother Septima) and Fr Julien acquiring ‘The Elms’.

The Elms was a grand Georgian estate built in 1728 consisting of the house and eleven and a half acres with a stream running through the grounds. This created an ideal learning environment for the Catholic girls of Rickmansworth and its surrounding area. The house was famous for being the residence of George Eliot at the time that she was writing her novel Daniel Deronda.

The school grounds back on to the River Chess and Chess Valley and a 17th-century barn that once belonged to the Abbot of St Albans Cathedral is located at the boundary of the grounds.

Houses
In total there are eight forms in each year, with about 30 pupils in each. The forms are named after Catholic saints, four male and four female:

Controversies

Notable former pupils

 Alex Campana, non-professional footballer
 David Connolly, professional footballer
 Mikee Goodman, heavy metal vocalist
 Danny May, non-professional footballer
 Mary Portas, television presenter and retail consultant
 Kate Nash, singer, songwriter, musician and actress

References

Schools in Three Rivers District
Secondary schools in Hertfordshire
Catholic secondary schools in the Archdiocese of Westminster
Academies in Hertfordshire
Rickmansworth
Educational institutions established in 1904
1904 establishments in the United Kingdom